The Vankleek Hill Cougars are a junior ice hockey team based in Vankleek Hill, Ontario.  They play in the National Capital Junior Hockey League. The 1991-92 season marked the first season that the Cougars advanced to the league finals in the playoffs.

The 1991-92 season saw the Cougars win their first National Capital league championship, taking the finals in a 7 games series against Casselman].

Season-by-season record
Note: GP = Games Played, W = Wins, L = Losses, T = Ties, OTL = Overtime Losses, GF = Goals for, GA = Goals against

Individual player awards

References

External links
Cougars Webpage
NCJHL Website

Eastern Ontario Junior C Hockey League teams
Ice hockey clubs established in 1991
1991 establishments in Ontario